is an athlete from Japan who competes in archery.

2008 Summer Olympics
At the 2008 Summer Olympics in Beijing Hayashi finished her ranking round with a total of 616 points. This gave her the 48th seed for the final competition bracket in which she faced Kristina Esebua in the first round. The archer from Georgia and Hayashi both scored 102 points in the regular match. In the decisive extra round Esebua scored 9 points, while Hayashi came to 8 points and was eliminated. Together with Sayoko Kitabatake and Nami Hayakawa she also took part in the team event. With her 616 score from the ranking round combined with the 616 of Kitabatake and the 649 of Hayakawa the Japanese team was in seventh position after the ranking round. In the first round they eliminated the Colombian team with 206-199. However second seed Great Britain was too strong in the quarter final, beating Japan with 201-196.  Yuki Hayashi is employed in the legal department of HORIBA CO., the Kyoto-based electronics and metrology industrial firm.  In 2018, she was a  member of the Japan National Archery Team.

References

External links
 
 

1984 births
Living people
Olympic archers of Japan
Archers at the 2008 Summer Olympics
Archers at the 2016 Summer Olympics
Japanese female archers
Asian Games medalists in archery
Archers at the 2010 Asian Games
Archers at the 2014 Asian Games
Asian Games bronze medalists for Japan
Medalists at the 2014 Asian Games